is a Japanese football player for FC Machida Zelvia.

Career
After graduating at Hannan University, where he shone and he was one of the best players of Kansai Student Football League, Yamaguchi signed for Kashima Antlers in January 2018. The young striker even had the opportunity of a trial at Fortuna Düsseldorf. On the first game in J1 League against Nagoya Grampus, Yamaguchi even found an assist.

Club statistics
Updated to 1 January 2020.

References

External links

Profile at Kashima Antlers

1996 births
Living people
Hannan University alumni
Association football people from Tokyo
Japanese footballers
J1 League players
J2 League players
Kashima Antlers players
Mito HollyHock players
Matsumoto Yamaga FC players
FC Machida Zelvia players
Association football forwards